Sabbatsberg Hospital (Swedish: Sabbatsbergs sjukhus) was a hospital in Vasastan in Stockholm. It was opened in 1879.

In 1986, Swedish Prime Minister Olof Palme was pronounced dead at 00:06 CET on March 1 at Sabbatsbergs Hospital, after having been shot in the street earlier that night.

The emergency clinic at Sabbatsberg closed in 1994. It is no longer operated as a hospital, although some healthcare-related activities are still located on the grounds, which partially have been rebuilt as housing.

Some of the scenes in the film The Girl with the Dragon Tattoo were shot in the hospital.

Notable deaths
Olof Palme - (died 29 February 1986) politician

References

External links 

Hospital buildings completed in 1879
Defunct hospitals in Sweden
Hospitals in Stockholm
Hospitals established in 1879
1879 establishments in Sweden